Facciamo paradiso (also known as Looking for Paradise) is a 1995 Italian comedy-drama film directed by Mario Monicelli. It is based on a short story by Giuseppe Pontiggia.

Plot 
The film tells the story of Claudia Bertelli, a young Italian girl born after World War II, who takes place contestating in '68, along with the Communists, and then mother full of contradictions and doubts over the years of modernism. She dies in 2011, in an era full of crisis.

Cast 
 Margherita Buy: Claudia Bertelli 
 Lello Arena: Calabrone
 Philippe Noiret: Padre di Claudia 
 Aurore Clément: Madre di Claudia 
 Dario Cassini: Lucio 
 Barbara Marciano: Anita 
 Gianfelice Imparato: Bellocchio 
 Moni Ovadia: Adamo 
 Marilù Prati: Teresa
 Mattia Sbragia: Detective

References

External links

1995 films
Italian comedy-drama films
Commedia all'italiana
Films directed by Mario Monicelli
1995 comedy-drama films
Films with screenplays by Suso Cecchi d'Amico
1990s Italian films